Alexander Unton (died 1547) was an English landowner.

He was the son of Thomas Unton and Elizabeth Hyde.

His home was Wadley House at Faringdon, formerly in Berkshire, and now Oxfordshire. The Untons also held Minster Lovell Hall from the king.

His first wife was Mary Bourchier, a daughter of John Bourchier, 2nd Baron Berners. In 1533 he married Cecily Bulstrode, daughter of Edward Bulstrode of Hedgerley in Buckinghamshire.

Their children included:
 Edward Unton (1534–1582), who married Anne Seymour, Countess of Warwick
 Henry Unton
 Thomas Unton
 Elizabeth Unton (died 1611), who married John Croke of Chilton

Alexander Unton was knighted at the coronation of Edward VI on 20 February 1547. He died on 16 December 1547.

After his death, his widow Cecily married Robert Keilway, and was the mother of Anne Keilway.

References

External links
 Monumental brass to Alexander Unton at Faringdon

16th-century English people
People from Faringdon
1547 deaths